Jonathan Collomb-Patton (born 4 March 1979) is a French snowboarder. He competed at the 1998 Winter Olympics and the 2002 Winter Olympics.

References

External links
 

1979 births
Living people
French male snowboarders
Olympic snowboarders of France
Snowboarders at the 1998 Winter Olympics
Snowboarders at the 2002 Winter Olympics
Sportspeople from Annecy
21st-century French people